Redes is a film score by Silvestre Revueltas for the 1936 eponymous film directed by Fred Zinnemann and Emilio Gómez Muriel. Redes means "nets" in Spanish. It was the composer's first film score, begun in 1934, when he visited the film crew on location in Alvarado, Veracruz. The film concerns the efforts of exploited fishermen to unite. In the US it was issued as The Wave.

Concert versions 
Revueltas arranged a concert version which he premiered in 1936, the same year as the film was released. However, in concert performance the music is usually heard in an arrangement by Erich Kleiber, made in the 1940s after the composer's death. Kleiber's version is in two parts and lasts about 16 minutes.
Part I
The Fisherman
The Child’s Funeral
Setting Out to Fish
Part II
The Fight
The Return of the Fishermen with Their Dead Friend

Critical reception
In his New York Times review, Aaron Copland commented that the music of Revueltas is "above all vibrant and colorful". He regarded this score to possess "many of the qualities characteristic of Revueltas's art". He added:

Recordings
The complete score has been recorded by the PostClassical Ensemble conducted by Angel Gil-Ordoñez for a version of the film released on DVD by Naxos in 2016. A CD of music from the score by the same performers without narration or dialogue (duration 34.17 minutes, twice the length of the usual concert versions) was issued in 2022, paired with Copland's The City (1939).

References

Further reading

 Bowles, Paul. Paul Bowles on Music, edited by Timothy Mangan and Irene Hermann. Berkeley and Los Angeles: University of California Press; London: University of California Press, 2003. .
 Contreras Soto, Eduardo. Silvestre Revueltas: baile, duelo y son. Teoría y práctica del arte. México, D. F.: Consejo Nacional para la Cultura y las Artes, Dirección General de Publicaciones, Instituto Nacional de Bellas Artes, 2000.
 Estrada, Julio. Canto roto: Silvestre Revueltas. Vida y Pensamiente de México. México, D. F.: Fondo de Cultura Económica, Instituto de Investigaciones Estéticas, Universidad Nacional Autónoma de México, 2012. .
 Garland, Peter. In Search of Silvestre Revueltas: Essays 1978–1990. Santa Fe: Soundings Press, 1991.
 Giro, Radamés. Imágen de Silvestre Revueltas. México, D. F.: Presencia Latinoamericana, 1983.
 Kolb Neuhaus, Roberto. "Redes: La versión de concierto de Silvestre Revueltas". Pauta, nos. 87–88 (July–December 2003): 38–53.
 Kolb Neuhaus, Roberto. "Silvestre Revueltas's Redes: Composing for Film or Filming for Music?" The Journal of Film Music 2, nos. 2–4 (Winter 2009): 127–144.
 Mayer-Serra, Otto. "Silvestre Revueltas and Musical Nationalism in Mexico". The Musical Quarterly 27, no. 2 (April 1941): 123–145.
 Nugent, Frank. S. "The Screen: At the Filmarte: The Wave", The New York Times (21 April 1937): 18.
 Slonimsky, Nicolas. Music in Latin America. New York: Thomas Y. Crowell, 1945.
 Teibler-Vondrak, Antonia. Silvestre Revueltas: Musik für Bühne und Film. Wiener Schriften zur Stilkunde und Aufführungspraxis: Sonderband 6. Vienna, Cologne, and Weimar: Böhlau Verlag, 2011. .

External links
 , Sydney Conservatorium of Music Symphony Orchestra, Eduardo Diazmuñoz conducting

Films scored by Silvestre Revueltas
1936 compositions
Suites (music)
Compositions by Silvestre Revueltas